Milan Radulović (1948 — 29 October 2017) was a Serbian politician, Professor and literary critic. He served as the Minister of Religion from 2004 to 2007. He died in Belgrade on 29 October 2017.

Career 
Radulović was born in 1948 in Malo Polje near Han Pijesak). He graduated from the University of Sarajevo Faculty of Philosophy and later received his MA and PhD from the University of Belgrade Faculty of Philology.  He had worked at the Belgrade Institute for Literature and Arts between 1974 and 2015 focusing on Serbian literary modernism.

He served as the Minister of Religion from 2004 to 2007 in the first cabinet of Vojislav Koštunica.

References

External links
 Official profile at serbia.gov.rs

1948 births
Living people
University of Belgrade Faculty of Philology alumni
Government ministers of Serbia